Hōgetsu Shimamura (February 28, 1871 - November 5, 1918) was a Japanese critic, novelist and leader of Shingeki. His real name is Takitaro (滝太郎). He was born in Shimane Prefecture. He graduated from Tōkyō Senmon Gakkō. In 1902 he studied abroad in the United Kingdom and Germany. In 1906, he founded the Bungei Kyōkai (文芸協会) with Tsubouchi Shoyo. He presided over Waseda Bungaku (早稲田文学) and was active in the naturalistic literary movement. In 1913, he established the Geijutsu-za theatre troupe with Sumako Matsui. His main works are Shinbijigaku (新美辞学), Kindai Bungei no Kenkyu (近代文芸之研究) and so on.

References

External links 
 島村抱月 - Kotobank

1871 births
1918 deaths
20th-century Japanese dramatists and playwrights
Japanese theatre directors
Japanese literary critics
20th-century Japanese novelists
20th-century Japanese poets
Academic staff of Waseda University
People from Shimane Prefecture
Deaths from Spanish flu